Sembi (செம்பி) is a 2022 Indian Tamil-language adventure drama film film directed by Prabhu Solomon. The film stars Kovai Sarala and Ashwin Kumar Lakshmikanthan, along with Thambi Ramaiah and Nanjil Sampath in other roles. The film was released theatrically on 30 December 2022 to highly positive reviews from critics.

Plot
Ten-year-old Sembi and her grandmother Veerathayi (Kovai Sarala), an apiarist, live peacefully amidst nature in the hilly regions of Kodaikanal. They lead a beautiful life until three influential miscreants, gang rape Sembi and shatter all their dreams. When a police officer chokes Sembi and forces her grandmother to withdraw the case after finding out the criminal is the minister's son , the latter has no other option but to thrash the officer to death. The two escape and board a bus called Anbu, which is on its way from Kodaikanal to Dindigul. All the 24 passengers on the bus, who are from different walks of life, thwart all the political interventions and guided by a lawyer (Ashwin Kumar) help the tribal woman and her innocent granddaughter to get justice through the enactment of POCSO act (2012). Veerathayi wins the case, as the 3 criminals get life imprisonment. While giving a glimpse of the journey of the passengers aboard the ‘Anbu’ bus, the film professes "Love thy Neighbor as Love thyself".

Cast 
 Kovai Sarala as Veerathayi
 Ashwin Kumar Lakshmikanthan as Lawyer
 Thambi Ramaiah as Anbu bus conductor
 Nanjil Sampath as Ezhilvendan
 Pala. Karuppiah as Politician
 G. Gnanasambandam as Judge
 Mullai Arasi

Production 
Most of the scenes in the film were majorly shot near Kodaikanal.

Music
The music of the film was composed by Nivas K. Prasanna which marks his first collaboration with the director. The first single titled "Aathi En Mela" was released on 28 October 2022.

Release

Theatrical 
The film was released worldwide in theatres on 30 December 2022 alongside Trisha’s starrer Raangi. The trailer of the film was released on 16 December 2022.

Home media 
The post-theatrical streaming rights of the film has been sold to ZEE5, while the satellite rights of the film is sold to Zee Tamil. However The Digital And Satellite Rights laterly changed to Disney + Hotstar and Star Vijay. The film had its digital premiere on Disney + Hotstar from 3 February 2023.

Reception
Logesh Balachandran of The Times of India gave the film 3 out of 5 stars and wrote "Kovai Sarala's intense performance is a treat to watch. She has done great justice to the role and carries the film on her shoulders". Bhuvanesh Chander of The Hindu wrote "Despite all the fumbles, Prabhu manages to leave you with hope. To the vulnerable sections of society, he assures them that they are not alone, and to the rest of us, he asks us to look out for others". Senthilraja R of News18 wrote "It makes it seem like the song is not being focused on because the story should be given importance". Saradha U of The News Minute gave the film 2.5 out of 5 stars and wrote "Makers of Sembi briefly focus on how sexual abuse is politicised and how it hardly benefits the survivors". Navein Darshan of Cinema Express gave the film 3 out of 5 stars and wrote "Nivas Prasanna fills in the shoes of Prabhu's regular composer Imman and he delivers a remarkable background score that almost compensates for the forgettable songs". Dhanushya of ABP Live gave the film 3.5 out of 5 stars and wrote "Overall, Sembi is a film that gives voice to the voiceless". Khalillulah of Hindu Tamil Thisai wrote "On the whole, Prabhu Salomon's Sembi, who intends to transmit the intense pain by committing sexual violence against girls, is stymied by some obstacles". A critic for Cinema Vikatan wrote "That's why the POCSO court trial shown in the climax and the vibe it gives passes without much of a shock to us." Sakshi Post gave the film 3 out of 5 stars and wrote "Sembi is a movie worth a watch." A critic for Behindwoods rated the film 2.75 out of 5 and wrote "Kovai Sarala's performance and a hopeful message make Sembi a film worth your money." Thinkal Menon of OTT Play gave the film 3 out of 5 stars and wrote "Watch it for the earnest performance of Kovai Sarala, arresting cinematography and sincere attempt at handling a sensitive topic." A critic for India Herald wrote "Applause is due to the makeup artist and costume designer for bringing some realism to the screen."

References

External links
 

2022 films
2020s Tamil-language films
Indian drama films
Films set in forests
Films directed by Prabhu Solomon
Films about murder
Films shot in Kodaikanal